Theriruveli is a village in the Ramanathapuram district of Tamil Nadu state in southern India. It is located near uthrakosamangai and belongs to the Mudukulathur Legislative Constituency. The economy is largely based on agriculture and sheep raising, and remittances from residents who have travelled abroad.

Administration

Theriruveli village is represented by the Mudukulathur assembly constituency which is part of Ramanathapuram (Lok Sabha constituency). Since its formation, the constituency has been represented in the assembly by members of Indian National Congress (INC), Forward Bloc, Dravida Munnetra Kazhagam (DMK) and All India Anna Dravida Munnetra Kazhagam (AIADMK) parties.

The High Court Bench started functioning in 2004 with the jurisdiction of the Districts including Ramanathapuram.

The nearest passport office is in Madurai, which serves the districts of Madurai, Theni, Sivaganga, Virudhunagar, Ramanathapuram, Thoothukudi, Tirunelveli, Kanyakumari & Dindugul.

Locally, Theriruveli has a panchayat (village council) which oversees the nearby villages of Anikurunthan, Chinnakaiayakam, Elankakkur, Keelapatcheri, Melapatcheri, Periakaiyakam and Vadakkutheru; as well as Theriruveli itself.

List of Assembly Representatives

R.S. Rajakannappan BSC, BL.
DMK
2021-

Members of Parliament

Culture

Excavation at Theriruveli

The Tamil Nadu Archaeology Department conducted an excavation at a site called 'Colony Thidal' in Theriruveli, under the supervision of A. Abdul Majeed. Nadu worked on this project with the assistance of N. Marxia Gandhi, R. Selvaraj, S. Santhalingam, and C. Chandravanan.

The excavation revealed shreds of many types of wares, including, but not limited to, Northern Black Polished Ware, coarse-red ware, blank ware, black-and-red ware, grey ware, Rouletted ware, and russet-coated ware. Six inscribed shreds with Brahmi script were also recovered. The personal names Korran, Sattan, and Nedunkilli, appear on the shreds. Objects including lids, hopscotch, spouts, terracotta ring-stands, iron pieces, terracotta lamps, shell bangles, sawed conches, and carnelian beads, were also recovered.

Notable places

Thiru Uthirakosamangai is an ancient temple  from Theriruveli.
Sri Bhama Rukmani sametha Sri Krishnar temple is located at yadava st theriruveli. 

Transportation 
This village is located in the center of its district, with frequent public state and private bus routes to Ramanathapuram, Muthukulathur, Kamuthi, Aruppukottai, Viruthunagar, Rajapalayam, Paramakudi, Sikkal, and Keelakarai. In recent years, people have used taxis and private cars for local commuting.

The Ramanathapuram–Muthukulathur Road and Sikkal–Paramakudi Road intersect at Theriruveli, which is colloquially called "Mukku Road".

References

Villages in Ramanathapuram district